Rampur Assembly constituency is one of the 403 constituencies of the Uttar Pradesh Legislative Assembly, India. It is a part of the Rampur district and one of the five assembly constituencies in the Rampur Lok Sabha constituency. First election in this assembly constituency was held in 1951 after the delimitation order (DPACO - 1951) was passed in 1951. The constituency was assigned identification number 37 after "Delimitation of Parliamentary and Assembly Constituencies Order, 2008" was passed in the year 2008.

Wards / Areas
Extent of Rampur Assembly constituency is Panwaria & Rampur MB of Rampur Tehsil.

Members of the Legislative Assembly

Election results

2022 by-election

2022

2019 by-election

2017

2012

See also
Government of Uttar Pradesh
List of Vidhan Sabha constituencies of Uttar Pradesh
Rampur district
Rampur Lok Sabha constituency
Sixteenth Legislative Assembly of Uttar Pradesh
Uttar Pradesh
Uttar Pradesh Legislative Assembly

References

External links
 

Assembly constituencies of Uttar Pradesh
Rampur, Uttar Pradesh
Constituencies established in 1951
1951 establishments in Uttar Pradesh